Loxopholis snethlageae is a species of lizard in the family Gymnophthalmidae. The species is endemic to Brazil.

Etymology
The specific name, snethlageae, is in honor of German-Brazilian ornithologist Emilie Snethlage.

Geographic range
L. snethlageae is found in the drainage basins of the Solimões River and the Urucu River, in the southwestern part of the Brazilian state of Amazonas, in northwestern Brazil.

Reproduction
L. snethlageae is oviparous.

References

Further reading
Ávila-Pires TCS (1995). "Lizards of Brazilian Amazonia (Reptilia: Squamata)". Zoologische Verhandelingen, Leiden 299: 1–706. (Leposoma snethlageae, new species, pp. 411–415, Figures 142a–142c). (in English, with abstracts in Portuguese and Spanish).
Goicoechea N, Frost DR, De la Riva I, Pelligrino KCM, Sites J Jr, Rodrigues MT, Padial JM (2016). "Molecular systematics of teioid lizards (Teioidea/Gymnophthalmoidea: Squamata) based on the analysis of 48 loci under tree-alignment and similarity-alignment". Cladistics 32 (6): 624–671. (Loxopholis snethlageae, new combination, p. 670).
Ribeiro-Júnior MA, Amaral S (2016). "Diversity, distribution, and conservation of lizards (Reptilia: Squamata) in the Brazilian Amazonia". Neotropical Diversity 2 (1): 195–421. (Leposoma snethlageae).
Ribeiro-Júnior MA, Amaral S (2017). "Catalogue of distribution of lizards (Reptilia: Squamata) from the Brazilian Amazonia. IV. Alopoglossidae, Gymnophthalmidae". Zootaxa 4269 (2): 151–196.

Loxopholis
Reptiles of Brazil
Endemic fauna of Brazil
Reptiles described in 1995
Taxa named by Teresa C.S. Ávila-Pires